The Vegetarian Epicure (1972) is a vegetarian cookbook by Anna Thomas , which contributed to the rise of the vegetarian movement of the 1970s.

History
Anna Thomas wrote her first cookbook The Vegetarian Epicure (1972) while still a film student at UCLA. It had a strong impact on the natural foods movement within the American counterculture. As noted in The Roanoke Times, "for many of the young people turning to vegetarianism in the late 1960s and early 1970s, Anna Thomas was the guru in their kitchens." Thomas later said that while she was a student at UCLA, she "wasn't eating much meat," and thus was focusing on vegetarian cooking. However, she states that there "weren't any good vegetarian cookbooks then. So I was just making things up in 1968 and '69, and somebody said, `Gee, Anna, you're such a good cook, you should write a cookbook.' And when you are 19 or 20 you say, `Yeah, OK, I think I will,' and then you do." The success of the book was due to the fact that it turned away from the ascetic approach found in American vegetarian cookbooks, and its ability to introduce pleasure to American vegetarian meals.

Additional cookbooks
Thomas has also published four additional cookbooks. Her next two books were also vegetarian: The Vegetarian Epicure, Book Two (1978) and The New Vegetarian Epicure (1996). However, her final two books included a mix of vegetarian and vegan recipes: Love Soup, and the Vegan Vegetarian Omnivore (which also included meat-based dishes).

Awards and nominations

Nominated
 James Beard Foundation Award: Vegetarian, for The New Vegetarian Epicure: Menus for Families and Friends (1997).

Bibliography
 The Vegetarian Epicure Alfred A. Knopf, 1972, 305 pages. .
 The Vegetarian Epicure, Book Two Alfred A. Knopf, 1978, 401 pages. .
 The New Vegetarian Epicure Alfred A. Knopf, 1996, 450 pages. .

References

External links

1972 non-fiction books
American cookbooks
Vegetarian cookbooks
 
Vegetarianism in the United States